Mark Chamberlain can refer to:

 Mark Chamberlain (born 1961), English footballer
 Mark Chamberlain (cricketer) (born 1961), New Zealand cricketer
 Mark Chamberlain (educator) (1931–2014), American educator
 Mark Chamberlain (photographer) (1942–2018), American photographer